Karetai  (c 1805– 30 May 1860), also known as Hone Karetai and Jacky White, was a New Zealand tribal Māori leader. Of Kati Kuri, Kati Mamoe, and Waitaha descent, he identified with the Kai Tahu iwi.

Karetai was born in Otakou, Otago Peninsula. He became a well-respected leader, liaising between his people and the newly arrived pakeha sealers and whalers. In 1832, Karetai was wounded in battle defending Kai Tahu land from northern raiding parties, losing an eye. He was a signatory to the Treaty of Waitangi and to some major subsequent land purchases. Karetai died in 1860 and was buried at Otakou marae.

Several of Karetai's whanau also became prominent figures, notably son Timoti Karetai (d. 1893), a notable tribal leader, and Timoti's daughter-in-law Maaki Karetai (1868-1945), a tireless worker for the people — both Māori and non-Māori — of Otago Peninsula. Karetai's great-granddaughter Louise Magdalene Teowaina Wallscott (1898-1999) was a notable member of the Māori Women's Welfare League.

References

1860 deaths
People from Otago Peninsula
Ngāi Tahu people
Year of birth unknown
Year of birth uncertain